{{Infobox football club season
|club               = Paris Saint-Germain Féminine
|season             = 2020–21
|image              = 
|image_size         = 
|alt                = 
|caption            = 
|ownertitle         = 
|owner              = Qatar Sports Investments
|chrtitle           = President
|chairman           = Nasser Al-Khelaifi
|mgrtitle           = Head coach
|manager            = Olivier Echouafni
|stdtitle           = 
|stadium            = Stade Jean-BouinStade Municipal Georges LefèvreParc des Princes
|league             = Division 1 Féminine
|league result      = 1st
|cup1               = Coupe de France Féminine
|cup1 result        = Abandoned
|cup2               = Trophée des Championnes
|cup2 result        = Cancelled
|cup3               = UEFA Women's Champions League
|cup3 result        = Semi-finals|league topscorer   = Marie-Antoinette Katoto (21)
|season topscorer   = Marie-Antoinette Katoto (25)
|highest attendance = 450 vs Reims
|lowest attendance  = 0
| pattern_la1        = _psg2021H
| pattern_b1         = _psg2021H
| pattern_ra1        = _psg2021H
| pattern_sh1        = 
| pattern_so1        = _psgfc2021h
| leftarm1           = 0A1254
| body1              = 0A1254
| rightarm1          = 0A1254
| shorts1            = 0A1254
| socks1             = 0A1254
| pattern_la2        = 
| pattern_b2         = _psg2021a
| pattern_ra2        = 
| pattern_sh2        = 
| pattern_so2        = _psgfc2021a
| leftarm2           = FFFFFF
| body2              = FFFFFF
| rightarm2          = FFFFFF
| shorts2            = FFFFFF
| socks2             = FFFFFF
| pattern_la3        = _psg2021t
| pattern_b3         = _psg2021t
| pattern_ra3        = _psg2021t
| pattern_sh3        = 
| pattern_so3        = _psg2021T
| leftarm3           = 000000
| body3              = 60002C
| rightarm3          = 000000
| shorts3            = 60002C
| socks3             = 60002C
|prevseason         = 2019–20
|nextseason         = 2021–22
}}

The 2020–21 season was the 50th season in the existence of Paris Saint-Germain Féminine and the club's 34th season in the top flight of French football. In addition to the domestic league, they participated in the Coupe de France Féminine prior to its cancellation and the UEFA Women's Champions League.

At the end of the season, PSG won the French first-division for the first time in the club's history beating rivals Lyon by a single point, having also eliminated Lyon from the Champions League at the quarter-final stage. 

Kits

Players

 

 

Competitions
Overall record

Division 1 Féminine

League table

Results summary

Results by round

Coupe de France

The 2020-21 Coupe de France Féminine began with a modified format to account for the ongoing impacts of the COVID-19 pandemic in France. However, the tournament was eventually abandoned after a select group of Round of 32 fixtures were played. No winner of the competition was declared.

Trophée des Championnes

PSG qualified for the Trophée des Championnes by finishing as runners-up in both the 2019–20 Division 1 Féminine and the 2019-20 Coupe de France Féminine to Lyon, but the match was cancelled due to the ongoing impacts of the COVID-19 pandemic in France.

UEFA Champions League

Knockout phase

The draw for the knockout phase was held on 12 March 2021.

Round of 32Paris Saint-Germain won 8–1 on aggregate.Round of 16Paris Saint-Germain won 5–3 on aggregate.Quarter-finals2–2 on aggregate. Paris Saint-Germain won on away goals.Semi-finalsBarcelona won 3–2 on aggregate.''

See also
 2020–21 Paris Saint-Germain F.C. season

Notes

References

Paris Saint-Germain Féminine seasons